Tim Saunders is a Cornish poet and journalist primarily writing in the Cornish language who also writes in the Welsh, Irish, and Breton languages. He is resident in Cardiff but is of Cornish descent. He is a bard of the Gorsedh Kernow, a literary historian and editor of 'The Wheel' – an anthology of modern poetry in Cornish 1850–1980. High Tide is a collection of his own poems in Cornish from the years 1974 to 1999.

Tim's daughters, Gwenno and Ani Saunders, were formerly singers with the British indie pop girl group The Pipettes, with Gwenno also playing the keyboards, and are now solo artists.

Standard Written Form
Saunders has spoken out against the development of a Standard Written Form of Cornish, saying

Selected list of works
 1977: Teithiau (Cyfres y beirdd answyddogol). Y Lolfa. (Author)
 1985: Gohebydd Arbennig. Y Lolfa. (Author)
 1986: Cliff Preis: Darlithydd Coleg. Y Lolfa. (Author)
 1994: Saer Swyn a Storiau Eraill o Gernyw. Gomer Press. (Author)
 1999: The Wheel: An Anthology of Modern Poetry in Cornish 1850–1980. Francis Boutle Publishers. (Editor)
 2003: Gol Snag Bud Ha Gwersyow Whath. Spyrys a Gernow. (Author)
 2003: Cornish is Fun: An Informal Course in Living Cornish. Y Lolfa. (Translator)
 2006: Nothing Broken: Recent Poetry in Cornish. Francis Boutle Publishers. (Editor)

References

Writers from Cardiff
Tim
21st-century Irish-language poets
Bards of Gorsedh Kernow
British male writers
Breton-language writers
Cornish-language writers
Irish-language writers
Welsh-language writers
Cornish nationalists
Cornish-speaking people
Poets from Cornwall
Living people
Year of birth missing (living people)